Leonard Dobre (born 16 June 1992, Bucharest) is a Romanian professional football player who plays as a striker.

External links
 
 

1992 births
Living people
Romanian footballers
Romania under-21 international footballers
Association football forwards
Liga I players
Liga II players
FC Sportul Studențesc București players
FC Politehnica Iași (2010) players
CS Sportul Snagov players